= Rajasthan Camel Act 2015 =

State law

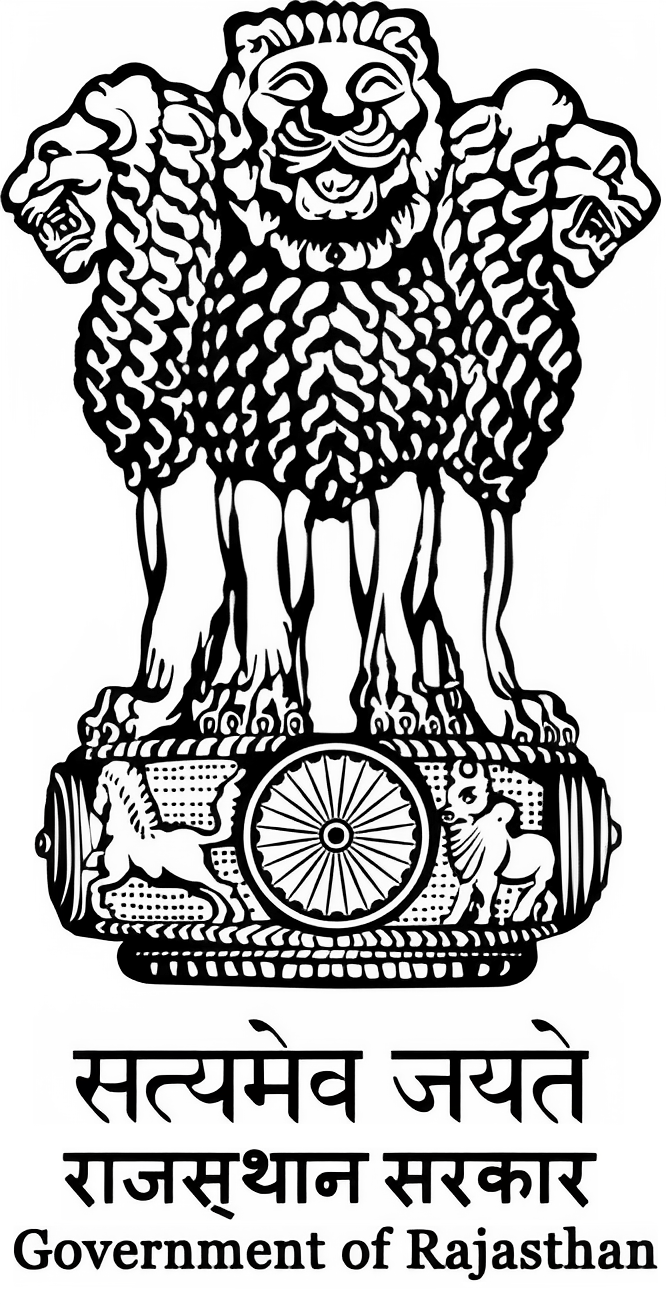

Rajasthan Legislative Assembly
- Long title: The Rajasthan Camel (Prohibition of Slaughter & Regulation of Temporary Migration or Export) Act, 2015
- Citation: indiacode.nic.in
- Territorial extent: Rajasthan
- Enacted by: Rajasthan Legislative Assembly
- Commenced: 2016-03-16

Legislative history
- Bill title: Rajasthan Camel Act 2015
- Status: In force

The Rajasthan Camel (Prohibition of Slaughter and Regulation of Temporary Migration or Export) Act was passed in Rajasthan, India in 2015. Supported by the Bharatiya Janata Party (BJP), it created restrictions on camel slaughter and export in Rajasthan, with the goal of increasing the camel population. However, it appears to have had the opposite effect, with a major decline in the number of camels in Rajasthan in the decade after the law's passage.
